Tri-Cities Airport  is a village-owned, public-use airport located three nautical miles (6 km) southwest of the central business district of Endicott, a village in Broome County, New York, United States. According to the FAA's National Plan of Integrated Airport Systems for 2009–2013, it is classified as a general aviation airport.

Although many U.S. airports use the same three-letter location identifier for the FAA and IATA, this airport is assigned CZG by the FAA but has no designation from the IATA.

Facilities and aircraft 
It has one runway designated 3/21 with an asphalt surface measuring 3,900 by 75 feet (1,189 × 23 m).

For the twelve-month period ending January 15, 2008, the airport had 48,200 aircraft operations, an average of 132 per day: 89% general aviation, 10% air taxi and <1% military. At that time there were 52 aircraft based at this airport: 86% single-engine, 6% multi-engine and 8% glider.

History 
The Tri-Cities Airport was the principal airport for the Endicott-Johnson City-Binghamton area from the 1930s through the early 1950s. In its early years it had a passenger terminal building, control tower, and cafe. The tower and cafe have since been demolished.  The main hangar, also built during the Works Progress Administration era, has also been demolished, in 2010.  The small terminal building still exists, although it has been abandoned for some years.

In 1942 the east–west and northeast–southwest runways were paved. A parallel asphalt taxiway and a few connector taxiways were added.

An Automated Weather Observing System (AWOS-3) was installed to provide current weather information to pilots.  In the flood of 2006 the AWOS was destroyed and soon replaced.  In the flood of 2011 the AWOS was again destroyed.  In Nov 2015 replacement was again completed, this time elevated well above the 2011 water level so as to protect the equipment from future floods.

Airport lighting 
Runway 3-21 is equipped with medium intensity runway edge lighting.  Both runway ends have runway end identifier lights. Runway 21 is equipped with precision approach path indicators, having replaced the older VASIs.

The airport also has an airport beacon, but hills - especially the one to the north - can limit its ability to be viewed.

Instrument procedures 
For many years a circling instrument approach has brought aircraft in from the north via the Binghamton VORTAC, about five miles (8 km) distant. Visibility required for the approach is 1¼ miles for categories A and B, with categories C and above NA. Some historical procedures in the 1970s required around 1¾ miles visibility as an absolute minimum.

With the addition of GPS-based navigation, straight-in RNAV (GPS) approaches were added for runways 3 and 21.  These approaches have slightly lower minima than the VOR-A.  Aircraft in categories C and above are still NA.  For details, check current approach charts.

Weather factors 
Being adjacent to the Susquehanna River, the airport experiences fog on a relatively frequent basis during the late night to mid-morning hours during the late summer to autumn with visibilities often under one-quarter mile.

References

External links 
  from New York State DOT
 Aerial photo as of 27 March 1995 from USGS The National Map via MSR Maps
 
 

Airports in New York (state)
Transportation buildings and structures in Broome County, New York
Companies based in Broome County, New York